Navia gleasonii is a plant species in the genus Navia. This species is native to Guyana and Venezuela.

References

gleasonii
Flora of Venezuela
Flora of Guyana
Plants described in 1930